Acme Township may refer to the following places in the United States:

Acme Township, Michigan
Acme Township, North Dakota

Township name disambiguation pages